Chervona Ukraina (Ukrainian: "Червона Україна") was an  light cruiser of the Soviet Navy assigned to the Black Sea Fleet. During World War II, she supported Soviet forces during the Sieges of Odessa and Sevastopol before being sunk at Sevastopol on 12 November 1941 by German aircraft. She was raised in 1947 and was used as a training hulk before becoming a target ship in 1950.

Description
Chervona Ukraina displaced  at deep load. The engines were powered by 14 Yarrow water-tube boilers. Four were coal-fired while the rest were mixed-firing. Chervona Ukraina was designed to carry about 630 officers and men.

The ship's main armament consisted of fifteen 55-calibre B7 Pattern 1913 guns in single mounts, six of which were mounted in casemates. Her anti-aircraft armament consisted of four  guns. Chervona Ukraina also mounted twelve above-water  torpedo tubes in triple swivelling mounts.

Service history
She was laid down on 3 October 1913 as Admiral Nakhimov after Pavel Nakhimov and launched on 6 November 1915. Construction was abandoned in 1917 during the October Revolution when the ship was about 80% complete. In the second half of 1918, the Marine Department of Hetman Pavlo Skoropadskyi restarted construction of the ship. On 25 January 1919, the ship was formally renamed Hetman Bogdan Khmelnitsky, but Nikolayev was captured shortly afterward by French-led Allied military forces.

At the start of the Russian Civil War, the ship was run aground at the fitting dock in Nikolayev by the shipyard workers to hinder the evacuation by the Whites in 1919. The ship was raised by the Soviets in 1920 pending a decision on her disposition. The ship was renamed to Chervona Ukraina on 7 December 1922. It was decided to finish her in 1923 and the job was completed in 1927 to nearly the original design. She was modified to handle aircraft by adding cranes on either side of the middle funnel and a parking area was built for them between the central and rear funnels, although no catapult was ever fitted. The original internal torpedo tubes were replaced by four triple  torpedo tubes mounted on the deck abaft the rear funnel.

Chervona Ukraina made a number of port visits to Turkey, Greece and Italy before World War II. She was extensively overhauled between 26 August 1939 and 1 May 1941 where her aircraft equipment was removed and she was fitted with new fire control equipment. The ship was given three Italian Minizini twin-gun 50 caliber  anti-aircraft mounts, one was placed on the forecastle, in front of the forward  B7 Pattern 1913 gun and the other two on each side of the quarterdeck. One torpedo tube mount was removed from each side and four single mounts for the semi-automatic  21-K gun were fitted as well as seven  DShK heavy machine guns.

World War II
Chervona Ukraina, in company with the cruisers ,  and a number of destroyers, laid down a defensive mine barrage protecting the Black Sea Fleet base at Sevastopol on 22 June 1941. She provided gunfire support to Soviet forces during the Siege of Odessa and escorted convoys bringing the 157th Rifle Division into Odessa during September 1941. She escorted convoys from Odessa to Sevastopol in October when the evacuation of Odessa was ordered. During the Siege of Sevastopol Chervona Ukraina provided gunfire support and evacuated cut-off troops from elsewhere in the Crimea into Sevastopol and brought in reinforcements from Caucasian ports. She was hit three times in the South Bay of Sevastopol by bombs from German Junkers Ju 87 Stuka dive-bombers from II./StG 77 on 12 November 1941, but didn't sink until the next day after her crew was ordered to abandon her. Her guns were salvaged and most of the guns and crew were incorporated into the port's defenses, although two of her twin Minizini turrets were added to Krasny Kavkaz.

She was raised on 3 November 1947, repaired, and used as a training hulk until 30 October 1950 when she became a target ship. On 10 May 1952, Chervona Ukraina was grounded on a spit to serve as a fixed target; by 1980 there was nothing left of the ship above the surface.

See also
 Chervona Ukraina, a  commissioned in 1989 and since renamed

Notes

References

External links

 Sinking of the "Chervona Ukraina" (in Russian)
 Cruiser "Chrvona Ukraina" from Black Sea fleet (in Russian, with photos)
 – article from encyclopedia of ships in Russian

Admiral Nakhimov-class cruisers
Ships built at the Black Sea Shipyard
Ships built in the Soviet Union
1915 ships
World War II cruisers of the Soviet Union
World War II shipwrecks in the Black Sea
Germany–Soviet Union relations
Ships sunk as targets
Maritime incidents in November 1941
Cruisers sunk by aircraft as targets
Maritime incidents in the Soviet Union
Ships sunk by German aircraft
Maritime incidents in 1952